Roma is a station on the Green Line of the Lisbon Metro. The station is located on Avenida de Roma, near the intersection with Av. dos Estados Unidos da América, enabling access to the Roma-Areeiro railway station nearby.

History 
The original structure was designed by the architect Denis Gomes with art installations by the painter Maria Keil.

Connections

Urban buses

Carris 
 206] Cais do Sodré ⇄ Senhor Roubado (Metro) (rede da madrugada)
 727 Estação Roma-Areeiro ⇄ Restelo - Av. das Descobertas
 735 Cais do Sodré ⇄ Hospital Santa Maria
 767 Campo Mártires da Pátria ⇄ Reboleira (Metro)

Rail

Comboios de Portugal 
 Sintra ⇄ Lisboa - Oriente
 Sintra ⇄ Alverca
 Alcântara-Terra ⇄ Castanheira do Ribatejo

Fertagus 
 Setúbal ⇄ Roma-Areeiro
 Coina ⇄ Roma-Areeiro

See also 
 List of Lisbon metro stations

References

External links 

Green Line (Lisbon Metro) stations
Railway stations opened in 1972